Alchemist is an action-adventure game for the ZX Spectrum and released by Imagine Software in 1983. The player controls an alchemist who can shape-shift into a golden eagle.

Alchemist was developed by Ian Weatherburn and Paul Lindale and was Imagine's first action-adventure. It was the first piece of software to be released on a gold-coloured cassette and box.

Gameplay 

The player controls an alchemist who has been summoned to defeat an evil warlock. The game is set inside the warlock's castle, with the game's primary objective being finding four pieces of a magic scroll. This allows the alchemist to use the "Spell of Destruction" to defeat the warlock.

The alchemist can transform into a golden eagle, requiring the use of spell energy. Transforming between the two is essential to completing the game. The alchemist can hurl lightning bolts and other spells, but the eagle form is required to negotiate steep hills or drops. The alchemist can only carry one item at a time and must consume food to keep stamina levels up. Movement, bumping into objects, or transforming depletes the character's stamina. Fighting monsters also reduces the character's stamina, although this can be mitigated by carrying an axe or sword.

Reception
Alchemist was released to positive reviews from critics. Reviewers drew comparisons to Atic Atac due to the similar atmosphere and play style. Sinclair User highlighted Alchemist's cartoon graphics and storyline. CRASH praised the game's presentation, graphics and "spooky organ tune". While the exploration of the castle was a drawback for one reviewer, overall opinions about the game's addictiveness was mixed. In CRASHs 1984 retrospective, it was felt that the graphics in Alchemist, whilst detailed, had not aged well. The jerky scrolling, poor keyboard layout, and lack of replayability were also criticised. Your Spectrum highlighted the alchemist character's graphic, and his eagle transformation animation.

References

External links 

1983 video games
Action-adventure games
Video games developed in the United Kingdom
Video games scored by Fred Gray
ZX Spectrum games
ZX Spectrum-only games
Single-player video games